The Department of the Northern Territory was an Australian government department that existed from December 1975 to September 1978. It was the second Australian government department of that name.

Scope
Information about the department's functions and funding allocation could be found in the Administrative Arrangements Orders, the annual portfolio budget statements, and in the department's annual reports.

The matters dealt with by the department at its creation were the administration of the Northern Territory of Australia and the Territory of Ashmore and Cartier Islands

Structure
The department was a Commonwealth Public Service department, staffed by officials who were responsible to the Minister for the Northern Territory.

References

Ministries established in 1975
Northern Territory
1975 establishments in Australia
1978 disestablishments in Australia
1970s in the Northern Territory